The women's high jump event at the 1990 World Junior Championships in Athletics was held in Plovdiv, Bulgaria, at Deveti Septemvri Stadium on 9 and 10 August.

Medalists

Results

Final
10 August

Qualifications
9 Aug

Group A

Participation
According to an unofficial count, 20 athletes from 15 countries participated in the event.

References

High jump
High jump at the World Athletics U20 Championships